Carnera  is an Italian surname literally meaning butcher. Notable people with the surname include:

 Luigi Carnera (1875–1962), an Italian astronomer
 Primo Carnera (1906–1967), an Italian boxer
 Raimondo Carnera (1915–2002), a Danish fencer
 Carnera (footballer) (1908-1986), full name Domingos Spitaletti, Brazilian footballer
Paolo Carnera (born 2 April 1957) is an Italian film cinematographer

See also

Occupational surnames
Italian-language surnames